Dhita Juliana (born 7 July 1993) is an Indonesian beach volleyball player. Born in Bima, West Nusa Tenggara, Juliana initially started her career as an indoor volleyball player when she was in the elementary school. She then continued as a beach volleyball player after joining the Ministry of Youth and Sports Affairs programme in 2008. Partnered with Putu Utami, she won the gold medal for the West Nusa Tenggara province at the 2012 Pekan Olahraga Nasional held in Riau. In the international event, she was the gold medalist at the 2013 Islamic Solidarity Games. She also won the bronze medal at the 2014 Asian Beach Games in Phuket, Thailand. In 2018, she claimed the bronze medal at the Asian Games.

References

External links
 
 

1993 births
Living people
People from Bima Regency
Sportspeople from West Nusa Tenggara
Indonesian beach volleyball players
Asian Games bronze medalists for Indonesia
Asian Games medalists in beach volleyball
Medalists at the 2018 Asian Games
Beach volleyball players at the 2018 Asian Games
Competitors at the 2011 Southeast Asian Games
Competitors at the 2019 Southeast Asian Games
Southeast Asian Games silver medalists for Indonesia
Southeast Asian Games medalists in volleyball
Islamic Solidarity Games competitors for Indonesia
20th-century Indonesian women
21st-century Indonesian women